This list of bridges in Slovenia lists bridges of particular historical, scenic, architectural or engineering interest. Road and railway bridges, viaducts, aqueducts and footbridges are included.

Historical and architectural interest bridges

Major road and railway bridges 
This table presents the structures with spans greater than 100 meters (non-exhaustive list).

Alphabetical list 
 Butchers' Bridge – over the Ljubljanica, in Ljubljana
 Cobblers' Bridge  – over the Ljubljanica, in Ljubljana
 Cock Bridge (Ljubljana)  – over the Gradaščica, in Ljubljana
 Črni Kal Viaduct – on the A1 motorway above the Osp Valley
 Črnuče Bridge  – over the Sava, in Ljubljana
 Grain Bridge   – over the Ljubljanica, in Ljubljana
 Dragon Bridge (Ljubljana)   – over the Ljubljanica, in Ljubljana
 Fužine Bridge   – over the Ljubljanica, in Ljubljana
 Hradecky Bridge   – over the Ljubljanica, in Ljubljana
 Jek Bridge   – over the Ljubljanica, in Ljubljana
 Kandija Bridge   – over the Krka, in Novo Mesto
 Kavšek Bridge   – over the Ljubljanica, in Ljubljana
 Ljubljanica Sluice Gate   – over the Ljubljanica, in Ljubljana
 Old Bridge  – over the Drava, in Maribor
 Prule Bridge   – over the Ljubljanica, in Ljubljana
 Puh Bridge   – over the Drava, at Ptuj
 Saint James's Bridge   – over the Ljubljanica, in Ljubljana
 Šempeter Bridge   – over the Ljubljanica, in Ljubljana
 Solkan Bridge  – over the Soča, at Solkan
 Triple Bridge   – over the Ljubljanica, in Ljubljana
 Trnovo Bridge   – over the Ljubljanica, in Ljubljana

Notes and references 
 

 Others references

See also 

 :sl:Seznam mostov v Ljubljani  - List of bridges in Ljubljana
 :sl:Seznam mostov čez Dravo v Sloveniji  - List of bridges across the Drava in Slovenia
 Transport in Slovenia
 Roads in Slovenia
 Rail transport in Slovenia
 Geography of Slovenia

External links

Further reading 
 
 

Slovenia
 
Bridges
Bridges